Antigonea, also transliterated as Antigonia and Antigoneia, was an ancient Greek city in Chaonia, Epirus, and the chief inland city of the ancient Chaonians. It was founded in the 3rd century BC by Pyrrhus of Epirus, who named it after one of his wives, Antigone, daughter of Berenice I and step-daughter of Ptolemy I of Egypt.

History

"The straits near Antigoneia" were mentioned in 230 BC, when a force of Illyrians under Scerdilaidas passed the city to join an invading army further south. In 198 BC, during the Second Macedonian War, the Romans marched against the Macedonian armies of Philip V. His general, Athenagoras, was able to occupy one of the nearby passes, leading to the Romans being held back. Initially the Romans were going to negotiate peace, however, several treasonous shepherds led the Romans to be able to surround and destroy the Macedonian army of 2000 men.

The inhabitants of Antigoneia had sided with the Macedonians and so when the Romans were victorious over the Macedonians in 167BC. Thus, the Romans decided to punish those who had fought against them. Consul Aemilius Paullus ordered for 70 towns in Epirus to be lit on fire. This included Antigoneia, which was never rebuilt. Antigonia is mentioned by the ancient authors Polybius, Livy, Pliny the Elder, and Ptolemy.

A newly discovered church, on the floor of which there is a mosaic of Saint Christopher and a Greek emblem, testifying to the city’s existence in the palaeo-Christian period. However it seemed to be the last building constructed in ancient Antigonea, the church was destroyed during Slav assaults in the 6th century AD.

Finds such as a bronze sphinx and a statue of Poseidon, which are exhibited in Tirana. There has also been evidence of pottery found across the hill in which the city was built, attesting to the size of the city at its peak.

Its ruins are located just south of the village of Saraqinisht in the Antigonë municipal unit, Gjirokastër County, Albania. Now that area has been declared a National Archaeological Park by the Albanian Government. The ruins are accessible from Gjirokastër by car or by nature trail. The Archaeological Park is also known for having organized since 2007 a yearly Festival of the Pagan Rites and the Popular Games. Recently, the village has hosted an annual culinary exhibition showcasing the best of local organic production and traditional specialties.

The ancient town was identified and excavated by the Albanian archaeologist Dhimosten Budina. More recently an Albanian-Greek team of archaeologists has been working on the site.

Description 

The most impressive feature of the city are its walls, demolished by the Romans, which completely encircled the hill, which towered at 600 meters above sea level. The most visible gate in the walls is at the south-western portion of the city. In the city center, an entire ancient street is exposed. In the southern end of the city there is also the most well preserved portion of the city walls. The wall section terminates at the small early Christian church of triconch form, whose mosaic floor is decorated with a depiction of a strange illustration of a human with an animal head, resembling the Egyptian god Anubis or Saint Christopher.

See also
List of cities in ancient Epirus
Tourism in Albania

References

External links
 Antigonea National Archaeological Park's Official Website

Archaeological sites in Albania
Populated places in ancient Epirus
Chaonia
Epirote colonies
Ancient Greek archaeological sites in Albania
Hellenistic Albania
Ruins in Albania
Former populated places in Albania
Pyrrhus of Epirus
Parks in Albania
Archaeological parks
Geography of Gjirokastër County
Buildings and structures in Gjirokastër County
Tourist attractions in Gjirokastër County